Stadl an der Mur is a former municipality in the district of Murau in the Austrian state of Styria. Since the 2015 Styria municipal structural reform, it is part of the municipality Stadl-Predlitz.

Geography
The municipality lies in the upper valley of the Mur about 16 km west of Murau.

References

Cities and towns in Murau District